Anne McGinty (born June 29, 1945 in Findlay, Ohio) is an American flutist, composer and music publisher.

Biography 
McGinty writes for bands of all levels, including elementary and middle school bands. She has written compositions and arrangements for concert band, string orchestra, flute, and flute ensembles. In 1987 McGinty and her husband John Edmondson formed Queenwood Publications. They managed the creation, production, promotion, and international sales and distribution of the catalog. In March 2002 they sold their company to the Neil A. Kjos Music Company. She later opened her own publishing company, McGinty Music. McGinty is a member of the American Society of Composers and a member of the National Flute Association, where she served for two years on the Board of Directors.

Education 
Anne McGinty started her education at Ohio State University. At OSU Donald McGinnis was her mentor, band director, and flute teacher. She left OSU to pursue her career in flute performance. During her time off she played the flute with the Tucson Symphony Orchestra. She later returned to Duquesne University to receive her Bachelor of Music, and Master of Music. At Duquesne she focused on flute performance, music theory and her compositions. There she also studied flute and chamber music with Bernard Goldberg, and composition with Joseph Willcox Jenkins.

Compositions

Pieces for Orchestra 
Dances In The Wind
Choral Prelude
Emerald Point Overturn
Painted Desert
Japanese Folk Trilogy

Pieces for Band 
Bandtasia
Athenian Festival
Atlantica
Discovery Overture
Pinnacle Overture
Prometheus Overture
Somerset Overture
Actium
Sea Song Trilogy
The Red Balloon
Debussy: sarabande
Painted Desert
Arlington Overture
Queenwood Overture
Atlantis
Emily (The Ghost)
Chorale and Canon
Prelude to Festival
Legend of the Eagle
Prelude and Dance
Clouds
Windsor Overture
African Folk Trilogy
Triton
African Folk Trilogy #2
Echoes
Flute Loops

Achievements 
 Received the Outstanding Service to Music Award from Tau Beta Sigma (national band sorority).
 Received the Golden Rose Award from the Women Band Directors National Association.
 McGinty was the first female composer to be authorized to write for the United States Army Band.

References

External links 
McGinty's website
Anne McGinty Interview NAMM Oral History Library (2010)

Living people
1945 births
People from Findlay, Ohio
American flautists
21st-century American composers
American women composers
21st-century American women musicians
21st-century women composers
21st-century flautists